Yehia El-Deraa (born 17 July 1995) is an Egyptian handball player who plays for Telekom Veszprém and the Egyptian national team.

He represented Egypt at the World Men's Handball Championship in 2015, 2017, 2019, and 2021, and in the 2016 Summer Olympics.
 
At the 2020 African Men's Handball Championship, he won the gold medal and was elected Most Valuable Player.

Honours

Club

National titles

Zamalek

 Egyptian Handball League: 3
 Champions: 2018–19, 2019–20, 2020–21

Heliopolis
 Egyptian Handball Cup: 2 
 Champions: 2015, 2017

International titles

Zamalek
 African Handball Champions League: 2 
 Champions: 2018, 2019 

 African Handball Super Cup: 2
 Champions: 2019, 2021

Al Ahly
 African Handball Champions League: 1 
 Champions: 2016

 African Handball Super Cup: 1
 Champions: 2017

 African Handball Cup Winners' Cup: 1
 Champions: 2017

National team
 African Men's Handball Championship: 3 
 Champions: 2016, 2020, 2022

References

External links

1995 births
Living people
Egyptian male handball players
Handball players at the 2016 Summer Olympics
Olympic handball players of Egypt
Sportspeople from Cairo
Handball players at the 2020 Summer Olympics
Competitors at the 2022 Mediterranean Games
Mediterranean Games silver medalists for Egypt
Mediterranean Games medalists in handball
21st-century Egyptian people